Kowad is a village located in Chandgad tehsil in Kolhapur district of Maharashtra.  According to the 2021 census, the village has a population of 3837. Kowad is situated on the banks of the river Tamraparni. The village lies close to the border of Karnataka, near Belgaum.

See also
Wikinews : A Christian congregation attacked in India, 12 injured

References

Villages in Kolhapur district